Pragma Group is a UAE holding company, founded in 2003, with interest in diverse businesses, including technology and telecommunications, marketing, hospitality, entertainment and venture capital.

History

Pragma Group was launched in 2003 by a group of professionals, and with Joseph Tabet as the chairman and chief executive officer of the group.
 
Since its inception, the group has managed to launch several International concepts in the Middle East, as well as develop myriad start-ups in the Lifestyle and Technology arena. Working with International partners such as Roberto Cavalli, the group has managed to expand while creating a structured foundation of a family of companies.

The company has rapidly grown since launching its business. With a turnover of over US$650 million per annum, the group today consists of brands ranging from the homegrown to the well-known, including Cavalli Club, Restaurant & Lounge, Cirque le Soir, Billionaire Mansion, The400 Nightclub, Epicure Catering, The Health Factory, the Bo House Cafe, etc.

Products and Services

The group is currently pursuing regional and international expansion drive, by building partnerships with well-known and successful brands.

Pluto Games FZCO

In 2003, Pragma Group took PLUTO GAMES FZCO, a young, gaming start-up, under its wings and transformed it into the leading distributor and marketer of digital gaming software and related products in the Middle East and North Africa.  Today Pluto DG is the singular distribution partner for Microsoft Xbox 360 gaming console in the Middle East and representing games publishers like Konami, THQ & Ubisoft.

LS2 International

After the group's success with Pluto DG, the team expanded their support to another IT start-up – Lateral Systems (LS2),  a technology integrator, a re-export hub for GSM products based in Dubai and covering mainly the Levant, Central Africa and Near East regions.

Cavalli Club & Cavalli Caffé

In 2009, Pragma Group in collaboration with International fashion designer, Roberto Cavalli, launched a new lifestyle club concept in Dubai. Cavalli Club Dubai opened to the media and the public, on 7 May at the Fairmont Hotel, located on Sheikh Zayed Road. This first step took Pragma Group from a Middle Eastern company to an International entity.
In 2010, Roberto Cavalli Group announced their partnership with Pragma Group in developing and launching the Cavalli Club and Cavalli Cafe Brands worldwide. In 2017, Cavalli Club, Restaurant, and Lounge were recommended by CNN in 2017 as the best party venue in The Middle East.

Cirque Le Soir Dubai

Ryan Bish, the owner of Cirque Le Soir in London in cooperation with Pragma Group, in 2014 opened Cirque Le Soir Dubai- outrageous shows and quirky humor, which become one of the most interesting nightspots in the city. The venue boasts a forever changing mix of performers, whose freaky skills will shock and surprise even the most experienced party-goer.

Billionaire Mansion

In 2015 former F1 boss Flavio Briatore launching the Billionaire Mansion in partnership with Pragma Group and Indian family the Nandas, who own the Taj Hotels Resorts and Palaces.

Epicure Catering & The400 Nightclub

In 2005 the group also added a local catering service and an international nightclub. Epicure Catering, one of the corporate and event caterers in Dubai and The400 Nightclub.

Le Talleyrand

Next, the group branched into a lifestyle. The chairman and CEO, Joe Tabet, teamed up with veterans in the culinary industry, to launch Le Talleyrand, in May 2005, a French cuisine restaurant, in Beirut, Lebanon.

Health Factory

Pragma Group took the lifestyle concept a step further with the launch of Health Factory in 2007. A health and nutrition concept, that aims to flog meal programs and life coaching.

Bo House

In November 2010, the group continued with its lifestyle expansion with the launch of a bohemian styled new age restaurant, Bo House cafe at Jumeirah Beach Residence (JBR) Walk, a waterfront community located in Dubai Marina.

References

External links 
 

2003 establishments in the United Arab Emirates
Companies established in 2003
Holding companies of the United Arab Emirates